David Main (1888–1961) was a Scottish professional footballer who played as a forward for Sunderland.

References

1888 births
1961 deaths
Footballers from Falkirk
Scottish footballers
Association football forwards
Falkirk F.C. players
Sunderland A.F.C. players
Aberdeen F.C. players
English Football League players